In Sioux mythology (a Native American mythological tradition that includes Lakota mythology), Anpao (Lakota: Aŋpáo), or Anp, is a spirit with two faces that represents the dawn.

Anpao dances with Han, a primordial spirit of darkness, to ensure that Wi does not burn up the Earth, resulting in day and night.

George Bushotter (Yankton Dakota-Lakota, 1860–1892) wrote that when his younger brother was ill, the brother was told to pray to Anpao, the Dawn, and recovered.

Anpao zi is the "yellow of the dawn", which oral history described as the meadowlark's breast.

See also
Anog Ite, a two-faced goddess from Lakota mythology
Bangpūtys, two-faced Lithuanian god whose focus is on the weather and the sea
Hausos, PIE dawn goddess, reflexes of whom are common in daughter cultures
Ikenga, two-faced Igbo spirit of fate, fortune, and achievement
Isimud, two-faced Mesopotamian messenger god
Janus, two-faced Roman god whose focus is on doorways, endings, and beginnings in general
Two-Face, a monster from Plains Indian mythology
Sharp-Elbows, a monster from Ioway folklore sometimes described with two faces

References

Parts of a day
Sioux mythology
Dawn deities